Heart's Haven is a 1922 American silent drama film directed by Benjamin B. Hampton and starring Robert McKim, Claire Adams and Carl Gantvoort.

Cast
 Robert McKim as Adam Breed
 Claire Adams as Vivian Breed
 Carl Gantvoort as Joe Laird
 Claire McDowell as May Caroline
 Betty Brice as Gladys Laird
 Frankie Lee as Bobbie Laird
 Mary Jane Irving as Ella Laird
 Harry Lorraine as Dr. Burchard
 Jean Hersholt as Henry Bird
 Frank Hayes as Pynch
 Aggie Herring as Mrs. Harohan

References

Bibliography
 Munden, Kenneth White. The American Film Institute Catalog of Motion Pictures Produced in the United States, Part 1. University of California Press, 1997.

External links
 

1922 films
1922 drama films
1920s English-language films
American silent feature films
Silent American drama films
American black-and-white films
Films distributed by W. W. Hodkinson Corporation
1920s American films